Opharus trama is a moth of the family Erebidae. It was described by Paul Dognin in 1894. It is found in Colombia, Bolivia and Ecuador.

References

Opharus
Moths described in 1894
Moths of South America